The 1986 Mid-Eastern Athletic Conference men's basketball tournament took place March 6–8, 1986, at Greensboro Coliseum in Greensboro, North Carolina.  defeated , 53–52 in the championship game, to win its fifth consecutive MEAC Tournament title.

The Aggies earned an automatic bid to the 1987 NCAA tournament as a No. 16 seed in the Midwest region.

Format
Six of eight conference members participated, with play beginning in the quarterfinal round. Teams were seeded based on their regular season conference record.

Bracket

* denotes overtime period

References

MEAC men's basketball tournament
1985–86 Mid-Eastern Athletic Conference men's basketball season
MEAC men's basketball tournament